The 2005 California wildfires were a series of wildfires that were active in the state of California during the year 2005. In total, there were 7,162 fires that burned  of land.

Fires 
Below is a list of all fires that exceeded  during the 2005 fire season. The list is taken from CAL FIRE's list of large fires.

Labor Day brush fire

On Labor Day Monday, September 5, 2005, a small brush fire erupted and burned parts of Rancho Peñasquitos and Black Mountain Open Space Park. The fire was fully extinguished by September 7. Despite its small size, the brush fire was the worst wildfire to affect San Diego City in two years, since the Cedar Fire of 2003. The wildfire resulted in 6 injuries, but did not result in structural damages. The brush fire determined to have been started by a teenage boy, who was subsequently arrested.

References

 
Wildfires 2005
California, 2005
2005